Hamilton is an unincorporated community in Fillmore County, Minnesota, United States.

History
Hamilton was platted in 1855. A post office called Hamilton was established in 1863, and remained in operation until 1904.

Notable people
Albert Plummer, physician and legislator
Henry Stanley Plummer, physician

References

Unincorporated communities in Fillmore County, Minnesota
Unincorporated communities in Minnesota